"The Holly and the Ivy" is a traditional British folk Christmas carol, listed as number 514 in the Roud Folk Song Index. The song can be traced only as far as the early nineteenth century, but the lyrics reflect an association between holly and Christmas dating at least as far as medieval times. The lyrics and melody varied significantly in traditional communities, but the song has since become standardised. The version which is now popular was collected in 1909 by the English folk song collector Cecil Sharp in the market town of Chipping Campden in Gloucestershire, England, from a woman named Mary Clayton.

Words

The following are taken from Sharp's English Folk-Carols (1911), the publication that first established the current words and melody:

Origin

The words of the carol occur in three broadsides published in Birmingham in the early nineteenth century.

An early mention of the carol's title occurs in William Hone's 1823 work Ancient Mysteries Described, which includes "The holly and the ivy, now are both well grown" among an alphabetical list of "Christmas Carols, now annually printed" that were in the author's possession.

The complete words of the carol are found in a book review dating from 1849, in which the reviewer suggested using the text of "The Holly and the Ivy" in place of one of the readings found in the book under discussion. The anonymous reviewer introduced the lyrics of carol thus: 

The words of the carol were included in Sylvester's 1861 collection A Garland of Christmas Carols where it is claimed to originate from "an old broadside, printed a century and a half since" [i.e. around 1711]: Husk's 1864 Songs of the Nativity also includes the carol, stating:  Early English Lyrics by Chambers and Sidgwick, published in 1907, repeats Husk's statement.

Variants
There have been many variants collected from traditional singers and early printed versions which differ significantly from the now popular version. The most popular traditional variant seems to have been "The Holly Bears a Berry", whilst the more familiar "The Holly and the Ivy" variant was sung with a variety of tunes and lyrics.

Lyrics

Music

Standard melody
The popular melody for the carol was first published in Cecil Sharp's 1911 collection English Folk-Carols. Sharp states that he heard the tune sung by "Mrs. Mary Clayton, at Chipping Campden", a quaint town in the Cotswolds. Sharp's manuscript transcription of Clayton's singing of the third verse, dated "Jan 13th 1909", is archived in the Cecil Sharp Manuscript Collection at Clare College, Cambridge and viewable online. The melody is notable in being confined to the notes of a hexachord.

Other melodies 
The words have traditionally been sung to countless folk melodies, including three further tunes having been collected in Gloucestershire alone. Some traditional recordings have been made which demonstrate this melodic variety; these include one sung by Peter Jones of Ross-on-Wye, Herefordshire, and another performed by Bessie Wallace of Camborne, Cornwall in the early 1930s and recorded by James Madison Carpenter, which is publicly available on the Vaughan Williams Memorial Library website. The "Sans Day Carol", considered a variant of the song, is associated with a different tune.

The early nineteenth-century sources do not provide music for the carol. Several late nineteenth-century collections set the words to "old French carol" in D minor.

Cultural background

Holly, especially the variety found in Europe, is commonly referenced at Christmas time, and is often referred to by the name Christ's thorn. Since medieval times the plant has carried a Christian symbolism, as expressed in this popular Christmas carol "The Holly and the Ivy", in which the holly represents Jesus and the ivy represents His mother, the Virgin Mary. Angie Mostellar discusses the Christian use of holly at Christmas, stating that:
 As such, holly and ivy have been a mainstay of British Advent and Christmas decorations for Church use since at least the fifteenth and sixteenth centuries, when they were mentioned regularly in churchwardens’ accounts (Roud 2004).

Holly and ivy figure in the lyrics of the "Sans Day Carol". The music was first published by Cecil Sharp. Sir Henry Walford Davies wrote a popular choral arrangement that is often performed at the Festival of Nine Lessons and Carols and by choirs around the world. Henry VIII wrote a love song Green Groweth the Holly which alludes to holly and ivy resisting winter blasts and not changing their green hue So I am and ever hath been Unto my lady true.

Hone's 1823 Ancient Mysteries Described, which lists the carol's title as mentioned above, also describes (p 94) a British Museum manuscript: The same volume contains a song on the Holly and the Ivy which I mention because there is an old Carol on the same subject still printed. The MS begins with,

Nay, my nay, hyt shal not be I wys,
Let holy hafe the maystry, as the maner ys:

Holy stond in the hall, faire to behold,
Ivy stond without the dore, she ys ful sore acold,
Nay, my nay etc

Holy and hys mery men, they dawnseyn and they syng,
Ivy and hur maydyns, they wepen and they wryng.

Nay, my nay etc

"The Holly and the Ivy" is also related to an older carol described by Sharp as: "The Contest of the Ivy and the Holly", a contest between the traditional emblems of woman and man respectively.

Holly stands in the hall, fair to behold:
Ivy stands without the door, she is full sore a cold.
Nay, ivy, nay, it shall not be I wis;
Let holly have the mastery, as the manner is.

Holly and his merry men, they dance and they sing,
Ivy and her maidens, they weep and they wring.
Nay, ivy, nay, etc

Ivy hath chapped fingers, she caught them from the cold,
So might they all have, aye, that with ivy hold.
Nay, ivy, nay, etc

Holly hath berries red as any rose,
The forester, the hunter, keep them from the does.
Nay, ivy, nay, etc

Ivy hath berries black as any sloe;
There come the owl and eat him as she go.
Nay, ivy, nay, etc

Holly hath birds a fair full flock,
The nightingale, the popinjay, the gentle laverock.
Nay, ivy, nay, etc

Good ivy, what birds hast thou?
None but the owlet that cries how, how.
Nay, ivy, nay, etc

Recorded versions (partial list)

1958: Petula Clark for one of the first British stereo releases, on the EP A Christmas Carol
1969: The Young Tradition on The Holly Bears the Crown, not released until 1995
1972: Steeleye Span, originally as the B-side of the Christmas single Gaudete
1982: George Winston (instrumental) on December
1985: Yes vocalist Jon Anderson on 3 Ships
1986: Choir of St John's College, Cambridge on Christmas Carols from St. John's
1987: Maddy Prior with The Carnival Band on A Tapestry of Carols
1988: Mannheim Steamroller (instrumental) on A Fresh Aire Christmas
1991: Therese Schroeder-Sheker - In Dulci Jubilo
1994: Natalie Cole - Holly & Ivy
1984: Roger Whittaker in his album Tidings of Comfort and Joy
2003: Mediaeval Baebes on their 2003 compilation Mistletoe and Wine and a re-recorded version on the 2013 Christmas album Of Kings And Angels
2004: Andrew Peterson Instrumental version on Behold the Lamb of God2008: Sound of the Rockies - Sing We Noel2008: Loreena Mckennit on A Midwinter Night's Dream2008: Kate Rusby on Sweet Bells2010: Annie Lennox on A Christmas Cornucopia (2010 and 2020)
2011: Hawk Nelson on the EP Christmas2014: Deborah Voigt and the Mormon Tabernacle Choir - Let The Season In2014: Los Campesinos! on their Christmas EP A Los Campesinos! Christmas2017: Ola Gjeilo performed by Choir of Royal Holloway on their album Winter SongsSee also
 List of Christmas carols

References

Further reading

External links

 Free sheet music for piano from Cantorion.org''
 Hymns Without Words  free recording for download suitable for services
 Steve Roud on superstitions
 "Notes on 'The Contest of the Holy and the Ivy'"
 Hymns and Carols of Christmas
 Ancient Mysteries Described Especially the English Miracle Plays, Founded on Apocryphal New Testament Story, Extant Among the Unpublished Manuscripts in the British Museum, Including Notices of Ecclesiastical Shows, the Festivals of Fools and Asses, the English Boy-bishop, the Descent Into Hell, the Lord Mayor's Show, the Guildhall Giants, Christmas Carols, Etc By William Hone, George Cruikshank
 Holly and Ivy Songs

Christmas carols
Songs about plants
Pinky and Perky songs
British Christmas songs
Marian hymns
Year of song unknown
Advent songs